Fazlur Rahman Malik (September 21, 1919 – July 26, 1988), commonly known as Fazlur Rahman, was a modernist scholar and Islamic philosopher from today's Pakistan. Fazlur Rahman is renowned as a prominent liberal reformer of Islam, who devoted himself to educational reform and the revival of independent reasoning (ijtihad). His works are subject of widespread interest and criticism in Muslim-majority countries. He was protested by more than a thousand clerics, faqihs, muftis, and teachers in his own country and banished.

After teaching in Britain and Canada, Rahman was appointed head of the Central Institute of Islamic Research of Pakistan in 1963. Although his works were widely respected by other Islamic reformers, they were also heavily criticized by conservative scholars as being overtly liberal. This was quickly exploited by opponents of his political patron, General Ayub Khan, and led to his eventual exile in the United States. He left Pakistan in 1968 for the United States where he taught at the University of California, Los Angeles and the University of Chicago.

Biography
Rahman was born in the Hazara District of the North West Frontier Province (now Khyber Pakhtunkhwa) of British India (now Pakistan). His father, Maulana Shihab al-Din, was a well-known scholar of the time who had studied at Deoband and had achieved the rank of alim, through his studies of Islamic law, prophetic narrations, Quran'ic commentaries, logic, philosophy and other subjects. Although Fazlur Rahman may not have himself attended a Darul uloom (traditional seat of Islamic knowledge), his father acquainted him with the traditional Islamic sciences, and he eventually memorized the entire Qur'an at the age of ten.

Rahman studied Arabic at Punjab University, and went on to Oxford University, where he wrote a dissertation on Ibn Sina.  Afterwards, he began a teaching career, first at Durham University, where he taught Persian and Islamic philosophy, and then at McGill University, where he taught Islamic studies until 1961.

In that year, he returned to Pakistan at the behest of President Ayub Khan to head up the Central Institute of Islamic Research in Karachi which was set up by the Pakistani government in order to implement Islam into the daily dealings of the nation.  However, due to the political situation in Pakistan, Rahman was hindered from making any progress in this endeavour. Orthodox ulema opposed his modernist interpretations and after Ayub Khan's power weakened, they denounced Rahman as an apostate and called for his death as a wajib ul qatl. He resigned from the post in September 1968 and left for the United States.

In the US he returned to teaching, and taught at UCLA as a visiting professor for a year. He moved to the University of Chicago in 1969 and established himself there becoming the Harold H. Swift Distinguished Service Professor of Islamic Thought. At Chicago he was instrumental for building a strong Near Eastern Studies program that continues to be among the best in the world. Rahman also became a proponent for a reform of the Islamic polity and was an advisor to the State Department. Rahman died in Chicago, Illinois July 26, 1988 at the University of Chicago Medical Center from complications of coronary bypass surgery. A resident of suburban Naperville, Illinois, at his death, he is buried in Arlington Cemetery, Elmhurst, Illinois.

Since Rahman's death his writings have continued to be popular among scholars of Islam and the Near East in many countries (including Pakistan, Malaysia, Indonesia, Turkey, and in the Arab region). His contributions to the University of Chicago are still evident in its excellent programs in these areas.  In his memory, the Center for Middle Eastern Studies at the University of Chicago named its common area after him, due to his many years of service at the center and at the University of Chicago at large.

He was a polyglot who, apart from mastering Urdu, Persian, Arabic and English quite early in his life, eventually also learned classical Greek, Latin, German and French in order to be more efficient in his academic career.

Views 
He argued that the basis of Islamic revival was the return to the intellectual dynamism that was the hallmark of the Islamic scholarly tradition (these ideas are outlined in Revival and Reform in Islam: A Study of Islamic Fundamentalism and his magnum opus, Islam). He sought to give philosophy free rein, and was keen on Muslims appreciating how the modern nation-state understood law, as opposed to ethics; his view being that the shari'ah was a mixture of both ethics and law. He was critical of historical Muslim theologies and philosophies for failing to create a moral and ethical worldview based on the values derived from the Qur'an: 'moral values', unlike socioeconomic values, 'are not exhausted at any point in history' but require constant interpretation.

He also believed that the modern conservatism of Islamic world is a defensive and temporary posture against the perceived political and economic setbacks of the Muslim world. Adding to this was stagnation in Islamic education begun in the early Middle Ages, which led to the inadequate understanding of Qur'anic teachings. He saw it as a priority to re-introduce intellectual disciplines such as philosophy, rationalist theology, and social sciences in education.

Social justice 
Rahman criticizes Islamic tradition for failing to develop a systematic Quran-based ethical theory, rather than merely a judicial code. He considers the theocracy and monarchy (imamate and caliphate) to be understandable attempts at creating a just society in historical times, and stresses the Quranic concept of shura (mutual consultation) for modern governance. He believes in extending the principle of shura to all of society, not only the elite, and in collaboration between religious and secular experts.

Riba
The issue of what riba is and whether it includes all interest on loans has been a major issue in Islam during the 20th century and early 21st. The Islamic revival movement that grew in strength and influence during Rahman's lifetime, considered all and any interest on loans riba and a "curse", and considered putting an end to it a top priority. As an Islamic Modernist, Rahman disagreed, believing that only high-interest loans were riba, and in particularly that riba referred only to a particular type of interest charged in the time of Muhammad.  He cited the Muwatta of Imam Malik in arguing that riba should not be interpreted literally but must be understood in the context of pre-Islamic Arab moneylending customs. Feisal Khan describes his position as being that 
"The banned riba in the Quran referred to a particular custom, riba al-nasiah or riba al-jahaliyah, where when the debt came due it was traditional to ask the borrower `will you pay or will you riba?` If the borrower chose the latter, he would be granted an extension on the loan but the amount due would be doubled -- hense the riba. ... If the borrower then defaulted on the doubled amount, his debt was redoubled and he was given another time extension: if unable to pay, he and all his possessions could be auctioned off to satisfy his creditors."Rahman himself wrote that "the initial interest itself was not usurious and was, therefore, not considered riba. What made it riba was the increase ... that raised the principal several-fold by continued redoubling." This contradicted the contention of famous Islamist author Maulana Maududi that there was no initial interest—that money lenders made initial loans "granted free of interest"—which was doubtful on the grounds that professional moneylenders would ever make loans for free. Rahman concluded that the Quran banned "extreme usury and so by extension injustice but not interest."

Reform movements 
Rahman criticizes the pre-modern revivalist movement of the eighteenth and nineteenth century for discouraging intellectualism; Modernism for selectively using passages and not being grounded in methodology; and neo-fundamentalism for likewise not being based on proper analyses. Rather than Islamic secularism, he was most optimistic about a "neo-modernism" based on an Islamic methodology, in contrast to previous reform efforts.

Interpretation of the Quran 
Mohammed Ali Ismail discusses how Fazlur Rahman contributed to the creation of the contextual approach for examining the Qur’an. The contextual approach when examining the Qur’an means to understand that the Qur’an was created in a specific time; therefore, it is context-specific to the time it was created.  Rahman says that two things or what he calls “a twofold movement” need to be done when trying to interpret the Qur’an into modern times, and through these ideas, his support of a contextual approach to the Qur’an is evident. The first thing Rahman says is modern people need to keep in mind the context of when the Qur’an was made. The second thing Rahman says that needs to be considered is modern social changes that would not have been possible in the time the Qur’an was made. People such as Abdullah Saeed and Nasr Hamid Abu Zayd also support the contextual approach. Amina Wadud and Sa'diyyah Shaikh claim to be inspired by Rhman's ideas such as his contextual approach to the Qur'an.

Influence on Islamic feminism
Fazlur Rahman did not call himself a feminist when he was alive, and people don’t usually outright label him as a feminist. However, some feminists, such as Amina Wadud and Sa’diyyah Shaikh, have claimed to have inspired or influenced by Fazlur Rahman’s ideas. Also, some feminists, such as Tamara Sonn, imply that Rahman’s thoughts contributed to Islamic Feminism. By combining Rahman and Ricoeur’s ideas, Jeenah argues that an Islamic Feminist Hermeneutic approach should be used to interpret the Qur’an.  Rahman’s ideas are represented in the word feminist in the Islamic Feminist Hermeneutic approach since Rahman’s ideas of equal rights can be seen as feminist.

Raja Bahlul emphasizes Rahman's contextual approach to interpreting legal proceedings from the Qur’an. Bahlul argues that a legal procedure in the Qur’an may become irrelevant, due to drastic social changes compared to the time of the creation of the Qur’an. An example of a legal preceding that may no longer be relevant is verse 2:282, which says two female witnesses are the equivalent of one male witness. Rahman argues that two female witnesses are equivalent to one male witness, because they are not used to being witnesses and may need each other to remember details. But Rahman also says that as more women become witnesses, they will get used to the experience and no longer need another female to help them remember the event. Thus, Bahlul uses Rahman to show that its possible to have feminist ideas within Islamic ideas without choosing one over the other.

Tamara Sonn looks at Fazlur Rahman’s ideas on Islamic Reform and how he influenced Azizah al-Hibri, to show Rahman's contribution to Islamic Feminism. Rahman often said that the Qur’an “is not a legal document” to emphasize that there are few things in the Qur’an that are not up for interpretation. Rahman argues that the reader must keep in mind the context the Qur’an was made in to be able to interpret specific rules to general rules that can be applied to modern situations. Al-Hibri agrees with Rahman that specific rules are not up for interpretation, such as worship practices, and general rules must be interpreted. Rahman saw polygyny in the Qur’an as something that occurred under specific circumstances, such as the Prophets, polygyny was becoming less common and monogamy becoming the norm. Rahman was neither for nor against polygyny, but the context in which it happens was most essential to him.

Publications 
Avicenna's Psychology, Oxford University Press, London, 1952.
Islam, University of Chicago Press, 2nd edition, 1979. 
Prophecy in Islam: Philosophy and Orthodoxy, University of Chicago Press, 1979, 2011 
Islam and Modernity: Transformation of an Intellectual Tradition, University of Chicago Press, 1982. 
Major Themes of the Qur'an, University of Chicago Press, 2009. 
Revival and Reform in Islam (ed. Ebrahim Moosa), Oneworld Publications, 1999. 
Islamic Methodology in History, Central Institute of Islamic Research, 1965.

Shariah, Chapter from Islam [Anchor Book, 1968], pp. 117–137.
  Islamic Methodology in history Urdu with Introduction by Muhammad Younus Qasmi, Iqbal International Institute for Research and Dialogue(IRD), 2021.

See also 
Contemporary Islamic philosophy
Islamism

References

Books, articles 
 Book Review By Faheem Hussain

External links
Revisiting Fazlur Rahman's Ordeal
Collection and review of Fazlur Rahman's works

1919 births
1988 deaths
Islamic philosophers
20th-century Muslim scholars of Islam
Pakistani writers
Pakistani Muslim scholars of Islam
20th-century Pakistani philosophers
Academics of Durham University
University of Chicago faculty
University of the Punjab alumni
Muslim scholars of Islamic studies